Alfred Noullez (15 May 1901 – 28 March 1964) was a French racing cyclist. He rode in the 1924 Tour de France.

References

1901 births
1964 deaths
French male cyclists
Place of birth missing